Nibbe is a Census Designated Place located in Yellowstone County, Montana and shares a postal ZIP code with Pompey's Pillar (59064).

The elevation is 2,894 feet. Nibbe appears on the Nibbe U.S. Geological Survey Map.

History

Once a station on the Northern Pacific Railway one mile west of the geological formation Pompeys Pillar, Nibbe was established as a town in 1920 along the Yellowstone River. Nibbe was an agricultural community in the Huntley Project area and had a grain elevator and a number of small businesses. The community gradually faded away with the decline of the agricultural industry and the concentration of activities moving to larger nearby communities.

A post office was active in Nibbe until 1954.

Demographics

References

Unincorporated communities in Yellowstone County, Montana
Unincorporated communities in Montana